Ruel Vincent van Dijk (born 29 October 2002), known mononymously as Ruel, is a British-Australian singer and songwriter from Sydney, best known for his singles "Don't Tell Me", "Younger", "As Long as You Care" and "Painkiller". At the ARIA Music Awards of 2018, he won the award for Breakthrough Artist for his single "Dazed & Confused". Ruel's debut studio album was released on 3 March 2023.

Early life
Ruel was born on 29 October 2002, in Isleworth, London, to English mother, Kate Vincent, and Dutch-born and New Zealand-raised father, Ralph van Dijk. His father is the founder of Australian radio agency, Eardrum. His family moved to Sydney, Australia in 2006.

Music career

2015–2017: Early years
In 2015, Ruel's father sent a demo of him singing James Bay's "Let It Go" to Grammy Award-winning producer M-Phazes.

In April 2017, Ruel released his debut single "Golden Years" with M-Phazes. In June, Ruel made his live radio debut performing Jack Garratt's "Weathered" on Triple J's Like a Version. At 14, he was the youngest-ever featured performer on the segment. The video gathered half a million video views in less than 48 hours.

In July 2017, Ruel released "Don't Tell Me", which peaked at number 86 on the ARIA Singles Chart. Later in September, Elton John played "Don't Tell Me" on BBC Radio 1, giving Ruel high praise.  The track was also featured in CelebMix's 21 songs by under-21s in 2018.

In November, Ruel joined Khalid on his American Teen Tour of Australia and New Zealand. Later that month, Ruel signed with RCA Records internationally. In December, Tom Thum released a cover of Rag'n'Bone Man's "Human" featuring Ruel on vocals.

2018–2020: Ready and Free Time EPs
On 24 March 2018, Ruel played at Pop Spring Festival, Tokyo, where he did his first meet and greet. On 4 April, Ruel performed at the Opening Ceremony of the 2018 Commonwealth Games. On 19 April, a music video for the single "Don't Tell Me" was released.

On 2 June, Ruel announced the release of his debut extended play Ready on 15 June, as well as a headline tour in June and July. In October, Ruel performed to a sell-out crowd in Sydney, and received the news that his single "Younger" had recently been certified gold by ARIA. On 11 October, Ruel was nominated for the Breakthrough Artist award for the ARIA Awards, which he later won, making him the youngest ever to do so.

On 10 January 2019, Ruel confirmed that he would appear on Hilltop Hoods' new album The Great Expanse, on the track "Fire & Grace". The album was then released on 22 February. On 1 May, he released the lead single from his Free Time EP, "Painkiller", alongside an accompanying music video. On 9 August, Ruel released the single "Face to Face" alongside a music video that was shot whilst on tour in France. On 13 September, Ruel released his second EP, Free Time. In November 2019, Ruel was an opening act for two shows of Shawn Mendes' self-titled tour.

On 31 January 2020, Ruel collaborated with Cosmo's Midnight on the track "Down for You". The music video for this song premiered on the 18 March 2020.

2020: Bright Lights, Red Eyes
On 4 September 2020, Ruel posted a video on Instagram with the caption "alayc", hinting at new music. On 10 September 2020, the single "As Long as You Care" was premiered on Triple J, before releasing later that day, alongside an accompanying music video. Ruel additionally announced his third EP, Bright Lights, Red Eyes, which was released on 23 October 2020.

2021-present: 4th Wall
Ruel's debut studio album 4th Wall was released on 3 March 2023.

Discography

Studio albums
 4th Wall (2023)

Extended plays
 Ready (2018)
 Free Time (2019)
 Bright Lights, Red Eyes (2020)

Awards and nominations

APRA Awards
The APRA Awards are held in Australia and New Zealand by the Australasian Performing Right Association to recognise songwriting skills, sales and airplay performance by its members annually. Ruel has been nominated for one award.

|-
| 2020
| Himself
| Breakthrough Songwriter of the Year
| 
|-

ARIA Music Awards
The ARIA Music Awards is an annual awards ceremony that recognises excellence, innovation, and achievement across all genres of Australian music. Ruel has won one award from the five nominations.

! 
|-
| 2018
| "Dazed & Confused"
| ARIA Award for Breakthrough Artist – Release
| 
|
|-
| rowspan="4"| 2020
| Free Time
| ARIA Award for Best Male Artist
| 
| rowspan="4"| 
|-
| "Painkiller"
| ARIA Award for Song of the Year
| 
|-
| M-Phazes for Free Time
| ARIA Award for Producer of the Year
| 
|-
| Eric J Dubowsky for Free Time
| ARIA Award for Engineer of the Year
| 
|-
| 2022
| "Growing Up Is"
| Best Solo Artist
| 
| 
|-

Nickelodeon Kids' Choice Awards
The Nickelodeon Kids' Choice Awards is an annual U.S. children's awards ceremony show that is produced by Nickelodeon.

|-
| 2019
| Himself
| Favourite Aussie/Kiwi
| 
|-

MTV Europe Music Awards
The MTV Europe Music Awards is an award presented by Viacom International Media Networks to honour artists and music in pop culture.

|-
| 2019
| Himself
| Best Australian Act
| 
|-

National Live Music Awards
The National Live Music Awards (NLMAs) are a broad recognition of Australia's diverse live industry, celebrating the success of the Australian live scene. The awards commenced in 2016.

|-
| National Live Music Awards of 2019
| Himself
| Live Voice of the Year
| 
|-

Rolling Stone Australia Awards
The Rolling Stone Australia Awards are awarded annually in January or February by the Australian edition of Rolling Stone magazine for outstanding contributions to popular culture in the previous year.

! 
|-
| 2023
| "Growing Up Is _"
| Best Single
| 
| 
|-

Vanda & Young Global Songwriting Competition
The Vanda & Young Global Songwriting Competition is an annual competition that "acknowledges great songwriting whilst supporting and raising money for Nordoff-Robbins" and is coordinated by Albert Music and APRA AMCOS. It commenced in 2009.

|-
| 2020
| "Painkiller"
| Vanda & Young Global Songwriting Competition
| style="background:tan;"| 3rd
|-

Concert tours

Headlining
 Dazed & Confused (2018)
 Ready EP Launch Tour (2018)
 Ready Tour Asia (2019)
 Painkiller Tour (2019)
 Free Time World Tour (2019)
 Growing Up Is_ Tour (2022)

Supporting
 Gallant - Ology Tour (2017)
 Khalid - American Teen Tour (2017-2018)
 Mabel - These are the Best Times Tour (2018)
 Shawn Mendes – Shawn Mendes: The Tour (2019)

References

External links

 

2002 births
21st-century Australian musicians
ARIA Award winners
Australian pop singers
British emigrants to Australia
Australian people of English descent
Australian people of Dutch descent
Child pop musicians
Living people
Singers from Sydney
MTV Europe Music Award winners
People educated at Redlands, Cremorne
Sony Music Australia artists